Mastermind was an Irish television quiz show that aired on TV3 as part of its autumn/winter 2011 schedule. The show is licensed to TV3 through BBC Worldwide.

The show is based on Bill Wright's concept which first aired on BBC One back in 1972. The show is well known for its challenging questions, intimidating setting and air of seriousness. The Irish version of the show was hosted by Nora Owen who is a former Irish Fine Gael politician. She was a Teachta Dála (TD) for Dublin North from 1981 to 1987 and from 1989 to 2002. She also served as Minister for Justice from 1994 to 1997.

Broadcast
The show was in fact broadcast on TV3 as 'Celebrity Mastermind' in June/July 2012. A series of 'Junior Mastermind' followed in November/December 2012. Irish radio personality Rick O'Shea was the winner of the celebrity edition, earning €5,000 for his chosen charity Brainwave - The Irish Epilepsy Association.

Format

The format directly mimics the original British edition of the programme. Each contestant usually has two minutes per round. First, each contestant in turn answers questions on a specialised subject (see examples below). The contestant may pass if he doesn't know the answer, rather than guessing. If a question is answered incorrectly, the questioner will give the answer, using valuable time. However, if 'pass' is given, then the answer is read at the end of the round. After the two minutes is up a buzzer is sounded, which is made up of four beeps; if a question is being read (or has just been read), then the contestant is given a short period of time to answer, leading to the show's famous catchphrase, "I've started so I'll finish." After this, answers to any passes are given.

After contestants have answered the specialised questions, they are given general knowledge questions. For the 2010/11 series this round lasts 2 minutes, 30 seconds, rather than the usual two. As originally aired the contestants would return for the second round in the same order as for their specialised subject. The contestants are now recalled in reverse order of points scored.

The winner is the contestant with the most points. If two or more contestants have an equal number of points, then the contestant with the fewer passes is the winner. The possibility of passing leads to tactical play as passing uses less time allowing more questions to be answered; but may count against the contestant at the end in the event of a tie.

Should the top two contestants have the same score and same number of passes at the end of the contest then a tie-breaker is employed, in which the two contenders are each asked the same five questions (one contender must leave the auditorium while the other answers). It is not clear what would happen should this fail to produce a clear winner, though it is implied that the process would simply be repeated as many times as necessary. It is, however, very rare for the tie-break to be required.

The winner goes through to the next round, where he must choose a different specialised subject. The winner of the final is declared "Mastermind" for that year and is the only contestant to receive a prize, in the form of a cut-glass engraved bowl.

References

External links
 TV3 website

2012 Irish television series debuts
Irish quiz shows
Irish television series based on non-Irish television series
Irish television series based on British television series
Virgin Media Television (Ireland) original programming